The best known portrait of Caracalla is that held at the Vatican Museums and of which several copies are known.

Judging by the large number of copies and comparison with medieval copies, the type was first created on his assuming full responsibility for the empire after his murder of Geta in 212. He is shown with an unusual twist in the neck towards the left and an accentuation of psychological character, inspired by Hellenistic prototypes but with added Roman feeling. The bust on which the head rests is 18th-century, but probably similar to the original.

It inspired Michelangelo in his portrait of Brutus at the Bargello museum in Florence.

Bibliography
  Ranuccio Bianchi Bandinelli and Mario Torelli, L'arte dell'antichità classica, Etruria-Roma, Utet, Torino 1976.

Sculptures of the Vatican Museums
2nd-century Roman sculptures
Caracalla
Roman sculpture portraits of emperors